Deni Pavlović (born 1 September 1993) is a Serbian footballer who plays for KÍ as a defender. Pavlović is the first KÍ Klaksvík player to score in a away match in Europa League for KÍ

References

External links
 
 Deni Pavlović Stats at utakmica.rs

1993 births
Living people
Footballers from Belgrade
Association football defenders
Serbian footballers
Serbian expatriate footballers
Red Star Belgrade footballers
C.D. Nacional players
FK Čukarički players
FK Voždovac players
FK Zeta players
FK Novi Pazar players
KÍ Klaksvík players
Montenegrin First League players
Serbian First League players
Serbian SuperLiga players
Faroe Islands Premier League players
Expatriate footballers in Portugal
Serbian expatriate sportspeople in Portugal
Expatriate footballers in Montenegro
Serbian expatriate sportspeople in Montenegro
Expatriate footballers in the Faroe Islands
Serbian expatriate sportspeople in the Faroe Islands